Peregruznoye is a rural locality (a selo) and the administrative center of Peregruznenskoye Rural Settlement, Oktyabrsky District, Volgograd Oblast, Russia. The population was 674 as of 2010. There are 4 streets.

Geography 
Peregruznoye is located in steppe, on Yergeni, on the left bank of the Rossosh River, 32 km east of Oktyabrsky (the district's administrative centre) by road. Aksay is the nearest rural locality.

References 

Rural localities in Oktyabrsky District, Volgograd Oblast